Philippe Gagnon (born August 21, 1992) is a Canadian football offensive lineman for the Montreal Alouettes of the Canadian Football League (CFL).

University career
Gagnon played CIS football for the Laval Rouge et Or where he was part of two Vanier Cup championship teams in 2012 and 2013.

Professional career

Montreal Alouettes
Gagnon was drafted by the Montreal Alouettes with the second overall pick of the 2016 CFL Draft and was later signed by the team on May 25, 2016. He played in three seasons for the Alouettes.

Ottawa Redblacks
Upon becoming a free agent, Gagnon signed with the Ottawa Redblacks on February 13, 2019. He played in nine games for the Redblacks in 2019 and started in eight. He was released on March 16, 2020.

Montreal Alouettes (II)
On March 19, 2020, it was announced the Gagnon had re-signed with the Montreal Alouettes on a one-year contract. He re-signed with the team on December 17, 2020.

References

External links
Montreal Alouettes bio

1992 births
Living people
Canadian football offensive linemen
French Quebecers
Laval Rouge et Or football players
Montreal Alouettes players
People from Capitale-Nationale
Players of Canadian football from Quebec
Ottawa Redblacks players